Stanford is a university in northern California, United States.

Stanford may also refer to:

Places

South Africa
 Stanford, Western Cape

United Kingdom
 Stanford, Bedfordshire
 Stanford-le-Hope, Essex
 Stanford, Kent
 Stanford, Norfolk
 Stanford, Northamptonshire
 Stanford-on-Avon
 Stanford on Soar, Nottinghamshire
 Stanford in the Vale, Oxfordshire
 Stanford, Shropshire, a UK location
 Stanford-on-Teme, Worcestershire

United States
 Stanford, California
 Stanford (Caltrain station)
 Stanford, Idaho
 Stanford, Indiana
 Stanford, Illinois
 Stanford, Kentucky
 Stanford, Minnesota
 Stanford, Montana
 Stanford, New York, a town

Other uses 
 Stanford (name)
 Stanford Financial Group
 Stanford Hall, Leicestershire, UK, a country house
 Stanford Park, its grounds
 Stanford Reservoir, nearby
 Stanford Hall, Nottinghamshire, UK, a country house
 Stanford Mansion, a mansion in Sacramento, California
 The Stanford prison experiment, a social psychology experiment conducted in 1971
 Stanford "Stan" Edgar, a character in the 2019 TV series The Boys

See also 
 Samford (disambiguation)
 Sanford (disambiguation)
 Stamford (disambiguation)
 Stanford Cardinal, the nickname of the athletic teams at Stanford University
 Stanford Lake College, in Limpopo Province, South Africa
 Stanford Super Series
 Stanford 20/20, a cricket tournament